Maryam Khanom Bani Isra'il was the royal consort of shah Agha Mohammad Khan Qajar (r. 1789–1797) and then the thirty-ninth royal consort of shah Fath-Ali Shah Qajar (r. 1797–1834).

She was from Māzandarān and of Jewish origin, and so is sometimes referred to as "Maryam Khanom Bani Isra'il" ( "sons - or children - of Israel") to distinguish her from Maryam Khanom Gorji, another consort of Fath-Ali. She was reported to have "no rival in beauty". 

When she was widowed the first time, Hossein Khan Sardar, the brother of the new shah wished to marry her, but the Fath-Ali instead married her himself, which caused a conflict between them. 

She had eleven children, among them prince Maḥmud Mirzā (1799–1835), Homāyun Mirzā (1801–1856) and Aḥmad-ʿAli Mirzā (born 1804).

References

Qajar royal consorts
19th-century Iranian women
Qajar slaves
People from Mazandaran Province
Iranian people of Jewish descent
18th-century Iranian women
Slave concubines